Flavocetraria is a genus of lichenized ascomycete fungi in the family Parmeliaceae. The genus contains two species found in arctic-alpine and boreal regions, Flavocetraria cucullata and F. nivalis (syn. Cetraria nivalis).

References

Parmeliaceae
Lichen genera
Lecanorales genera
Taxa named by Ingvar Kärnefelt
Taxa described in 1994